Beddington Lane railway station was a single-platform station on the West Croydon to Wimbledon Line. Situated in a semi-rural location, the nearest major settlements were Beddington and Mitcham.

History
After the Surrey Iron Railway went out of business in 1846, a new railway was built on the line by the Wimbledon and Croydon Railway, which opened the station on 22 October 1855. It was originally named Beddington but was renamed in January 1887 to Beddington Lane. In 1919 it became Beddington Lane Halt, but reverted to Beddington Lane on 5 May 1969.

The station closed with the line after the last train ran on 31 May 1997. Beddington Lane tram stop was built on the site.

References

Former London, Brighton and South Coast Railway stations
Railway stations in Great Britain opened in 1855
Railway stations in Great Britain closed in 1997
Disused railway stations in the London Borough of Sutton